Astrea may refer to:

 Astraea, Greek deity
 Astrea, Colombia, a municipality in the department of Cesar, Colombia
 ASTREA, an acronym for the Aerial Support To Regional Enforcement Agencies unit of the San Diego County Sheriff's Department
 Astrea, a leading protagonist of the 1978 Filmation animated television series, Space Sentinels
 Astrea, the pseudonym used by writer Aphra Behn
 Astrea (coral), a genus of corals from the Merulinidae family
 Astrea placata, a Russian opera by Tommaso Traetta
 Astrea Redux, a poem by John Dryden
 HMS Astrea, one of several vessels, primarily frigates, of the Royal Navy
 Il ritorno di Astrea, a poem by Vincenzo Monti
 , a United States Navy patrol boat in commission from 1917 to 1919 or 1920
 Astrea, West End, a heritage-listed house in Queensland, Australia
 A.S.D. Astrea, an association football club based in Rome

See also
Astrée (disambiguation)